Neen Sollars railway station was a station on the Tenbury & Bewdley railway in Neen Sollars, Shropshire, England. The station opened on 13 August 1864. A second staggered platform was opened in 1878, reached via a board crossing. This platform was taken out of use on 22 August 1954, the same date on which the station's signal box closed. The station became unstaffed in July 1961  and closed for passenger use on 1 August 1962, although goods traffic continued until January 1964.

Although its station building survives much of its distinctive character is lost as a result of many of its original 1864 William Clarke architectural features having been removed.

References

Further reading

External links
 The Woofferton and Tenbury Line
 OXFORD, WORCESTER & WOLVERHAMPTON RAILWAY & the formation of the WEST MIDLAND RAILWAY August 1853-60
 Severn Valley Railway

Railway stations in Great Britain opened in 1864
Railway stations in Great Britain closed in 1962
Disused railway stations in Shropshire
Former Great Western Railway stations